Payanigal Gavanikkavum is a 2022 Indian Tamil-language comedy drama film directed by S. P. Shakthivel and produced by All In Pictures. The film stars Vidharth and Karunakaran with a supporting cast including Lakshmi Priyaa Chandramouli, Masoom Shankar, and Prem Kumar. The film's music is composed by Shanmanth Nag, with cinematography handled by S. Pandikumar and editing done by R. S. Sathishkumar. The film is a remake of the 2019 Malayalam film Vikruthi written by Ajeesh P. Thomas and directed by Emcy Joseph. The film premiered on Aha on 29 April 2022.

Plot
Ezhilan and his wife Tamil are both hearing and speech impaired. After spending two nights in the hospital where his daughter was admitted, Ezhilan travels back home on a Chennai Metro train but he falls asleep. Another passenger, Antony, finds this amusing and decides to post a picture of Ezhilan online, labelling him a drunkard. The rest of the movie explores the troubles Ezhilan and his family face when he is recognized by people as the "Chennai Metro Drunkard", as well as how Antony deals with the consequences of his actions.

Cast

Production
The film was announced directly  Digital Premier by Aha (streaming service) . The film is a remake of the Malayalam film Vikruthi. The film trailer was released on 24 April 2022.

Reception
The film premiered on Aha on 29 April 2022. Sruthi Raman of The Times of India cited that "This dramedy explores the double-sidedness of social media" and further wrote that "While the film does have a needed message for the internet generation of our times, it’s not as breezy as it intends to be".S Subhakeerthana from OTTPlay noted that "Payanigal Gavanikkavum makes us smile, laugh and cry. The film is simple, yet compelling, and is worth a watch." Gave 3 out of 5 Rating. Zee News Critic mentioned that "The film emotionally conveys the problems caused to the people concerned by taking photos and videos of the small actions of a stranger in public and posting them on social media. We don't see the real situation behind the ordinary passing. Director Sakthivel Perumalsamy has decided to tell this strongly and has directed this film. The patiently moving screenplay tests our patience but the message of the film makes us forget everything."Dinamalar Critic gave 3 out 5 rating for the film.

References

Indian direct-to-video films
2020s Tamil-language films
Tamil remakes of Malayalam films
Aha (streaming service) original films
2022 comedy-drama films
Indian comedy-drama films